LaDonna Lynn Appelbaum (born February 10, 1967) is a Democratic member of the Missouri General Assembly, representing the state's 71st House district which covers portions of St. Louis County, Missouri.

Career
Appelbaum won the election on 6 November 2018 from the platform of Democratic Party. She secured seventy-seven percent of the vote while her closest rival Libertarian LaDonna Higgins secured twenty-three percent.

Electoral History

References

Applebaum, LaDonna
Living people
21st-century American politicians
21st-century American women politicians
Women state legislators in Missouri
1967 births